Jim Moran (born April 17, 1972) is an American freestyle skier. He competed in the men's moguls event at the 1998 Winter Olympics. In 1999, he crashed while competing in a race, which lead to the end of his career.

Biography
Moran was born in Pompton Plains, New Jersey in 1972. He was part of the American freestyle ski team for most of the 1990s. At the FIS Freestyle Ski World Cup, Moran was a two-time mogul champion, winning the event at the 1992–93 FIS Freestyle Ski World Cup and the 1995–96 FIS Freestyle Ski World Cup.

Originally he was not selected to compete at the 1998 Winter Olympics. However, following a successful petition to the United States Olympic & Paralympic Committee and arbitration hearing, he was granted a spot on the US team. Despite the US team being able to select up to fourteen skiers for the Olympics, only eleven where initially selected.  At the 1998 Winter Olympics in Nagano, Moran competed in the men's moguls event, finishing in 23rd place.

In February 1999, Moran fell off a cliff during a skiing race, suffering a head injury. Despite being in a coma for almost a month, and suffering with partial paralysis, he made a fully recovery. However, the injury forced him to retire from the sport.

In 2008, Moran gained a degree with the University of Utah, and later moved to Salt Lake City.

References

External links
 

1972 births
Living people
American male freestyle skiers
Olympic freestyle skiers of the United States
Freestyle skiers at the 1998 Winter Olympics
People from Pequannock Township, New Jersey
Sportspeople from Morris County, New Jersey